The Twenty-ninth Oklahoma Legislature was a meeting of the legislative branch of the government of Oklahoma, composed of the Oklahoma Senate and the Oklahoma House of Representatives. The state legislature met in regular session at the Oklahoma State Capitol in Oklahoma City from January 8 to June 14, 1963, during the first term of Governor Henry Bellmon. This was the last state legislature with members representing counties under the old system of districting; a new system was created by a court order that forced Oklahoma to equalize representation.

Dates of session
January 8-June 14, 1963
Previous: 28th Legislature • Next: 30th Legislature

Party composition

Senate

Senate

Leadership

Democratic leadership
President of the Senate: Lieutenant Governor Leo Winters
President Pro Tem of the Senate: Roy C. Boecher
Speaker of the House: J.D. McCarty
Speaker Pro Tempore: Rex Privett
Majority Floor Leader: Leland Wolf

Republican leadership
Minority Leader: C.W. Doornbos

Members

Senate

Table based on 2005 Oklahoma Almanac.

House of Representatives

Table based on database of historic members.

References

Oklahoma legislative sessions
1963 in Oklahoma
1964 in Oklahoma
1963 U.S. legislative sessions
1964 U.S. legislative sessions